Mesbahuddin Ahmed (23 March 1947 – 18 April 2021), known by his stage name Wasim, was a Bangladeshi film actor.

In 1964, he was crowned as 'Mr. East Pakistan' for bodybuilding in the then East Pakistan (currently Bangladesh). He also served as the first Secretary General of National Sports Council. He was instrumental in bringing legendary famed boxer Muhammad Ali to Bangladesh during his tenure as the first Secretary General of National Sports Council. He has worked in more than 200 Bangladeshi films and many of his movies were commercially successful.

Early life
Mesbahuddin Ahmed was born on 23 March 1947, in Shutrapur in the old part of Dhaka. Although his roots are from Chandpur, he spent a great deal of his childhood and adolescence in Shutrapur and Mymensingh primarily because his father, who was a government officer, was stationed in those places. He completed his matriculation from Mymensingh Zilla School and thereafter his Intermediate from Anondomohan College in Mymensingh. Right after he enrolled in Dhaka University and graduated with a B.A. (Honours) and later a master M.A. qualification in general history.

Career
Before moving on to the film industry he also worked in Bangladesh Betar and also served as the first Secretary General of National Sports Council. He also served as the President of Bangladesh Bodybuilding Federation briefly. He started his career in the film industry as an assistant director of the film Chhando Hariye Gelo (1972), directed by S.M. Shafi. He first acted in the lead role in the film Rater Por Din (1973) which also included Bobita as co-artiste in the cast.

Filmography
Some notable works of Wasim include amongst others:

Personal life
His wife, Parveen Ahmed Ruhi, died in 2003. They had a son and daughter. Their son, Dewan Fardun, is a barrister in England. Their daughter, Bushra Ahmed (born July 23, 1991), committed suicide in June 4, 2006 at the age of 14. Wasim died from a number of health complications on 18 April 2021 at Shahabuddin Medical College Hospital, Dhaka, Bangladesh.

References

External links
 

2021 deaths
Bangladeshi male film actors
1947 births
Mymensingh Zilla School alumni
University of Dhaka alumni